PNP Agar is an agar medium used in microbiology to identify Staphylococcus species that have phosphatase activity.  The medium changes color when p-nitrophenylphosphate disodium (PNP) is dephosphorylated. 

PNP agar is composed of Mueller–Hinton agar buffered to pH 5.6 to 5.8, with the addition of 0.495 mg/mL PNP.

References

Microbiological media
Cell culture media